Joy Williams may refer to:

 Joy Williams (Australian writer) (1942–2006), Australian poet
 Joy Williams (American writer) (born 1944), American fiction writer
 Joy Williams (singer) (born 1982), American musician
Joy Williams (album), the singer's 2001 debut album
Joy Ann Williams, American immunologist